The Estonian Yachting Union is the national governing body for the sport of sailing in Estonia, recognised by the World Sailing. The EYU newspaper in 1989–1995 was Purjetaja.

Notable sailors
See :Category:Estonian sailors

Olympic sailing
See :Category:Olympic sailors of Estonia

Offshore sailing
See :Category:Estonian sailors (sport)

References

External links
 Official website

Sports organizations established in 1928
Estonia
Sailing
Sailing
1928 establishments in Estonia